Edward Howell may refer to:

 Edward Howell (politician) (1792–1871), U.S. Representative from New York
 Edward Howell (cellist) (1846–1898), British cellist and music professor
 Edward H. Howell (1915–1994), American jurist in the state of Oregon
 Blue Howell (Edward E. Howell, 1905–1964), American football player and coach
 Edward Howell (actor) (1902–1986), British Australia actor and scriptwriter
 Edward Howell (died 1655) (1584–1655), English Puritan who settled in Massachusetts

See also
Edwin Howell (disambiguation)